Parliamentary elections were held in Slovenia on 3 June 2018. The elections were originally expected to be held later in June 2018, but after the resignation of Prime Minister Miro Cerar on 14 March 2018 all parties called for snap elections. They were the third consecutive snap elections after 2011 and 2014.

Background 
On 14 March 2018, Supreme Court of the Republic of Slovenia delivered a judgement regarding the railway referendum, held in 2017 on the construction of a second railway connection from Koper to Divača. In the judgement, the court annulled the results and ordered a new vote. The railway link was the biggest project of the Cerar cabinet.

Later that day, Prime Minister Cerar announced that he would resign from the post at a press conference following a cabinet meeting. Cerar explained that he had resigned due to bad relations within the coalition between the Social Democrats (SD) and the Democratic Party of Pensioners of Slovenia (DeSUS) following a decision of the Supreme Court earlier that day, which he stated would slow down the infrastructural development of Slovenia due to strikes and demands of public sector trade unions. The following day, he sent his letter of resignation to the Speaker of the National Assembly. Cerar was the second consecutive Prime Minister after Alenka Bratušek to resign. The two previous Prime Ministers, Janez Janša (2012–2013) and Borut Pahor (2008–2012), were removed from the office by vote of no confidence, meaning that Janša's first term in office (2004–2008) remains the most recently completed full term in office.

After the resignation of a prime minister, a new candidate can be nominated by the president. However, President Borut Pahor announced after a meeting with Cerar that he would not nominate anyone for the post. Members of the National Assembly also announced that they will not nominate a candidate, and called for early elections.

According to the Constitution, regularly scheduled elections should have been held no sooner than two months and no later than 15 days before the expiry of four years from the first session of current National Assembly. Elections were therefore expected to be held between 1 June and 15 July 2018. Following the resignation of Cerar, elections were held on 3 June 2018.

On 20 March 2018, the Slovenian Democratic Party (SDS) announced that after consultations with President Pahor they were calling for elections to be held on 10 June 2018 and that they would nominate a candidate for Prime Minister to postpone the elections if needed. The Modern Centre Party (SMC) also called for elections to be held at a later date due to the ongoing procedure to adopt a constitutional law protecting the country's biggest bank, NLB, from Croatian actions in violation of international agreement between the countries as well as the upcoming process before the European Court of Justice on arbitration between Slovenia and Croatia. On the same day, independent MP Janko Veber announced that he would try and nominate himself for the position of interim Prime Minister, though none of the political parties expressed its support.

At the time of Cerar's resignation, four investigative commissions were ongoing in the National Assembly. Two of them are investigating banks (one on why an injection of €3.2 billion of  equity capital was needed during the premiership of Alenka Bratušek and the other on the possible funding of terrorism through Slovenian banks), one is looking at corruption during the construction of the Šoštanj Thermal Power Plant (TEŠ6); and the other investigating corruption in healthcare system. All four commissions are expected to issue final reports in April and May, which must be approved by a vote in the National Assembly. Some current politicians are expected to be charged with responsibility for the scandals, including Janez Janša (SDS) and Borut Pahor (SD). It was suggested in the media that Social Democrats may be in favour of early elections so that the commissions could not finish their work.

On 14 April 2018, after no candidate for the Prime Minister was nominated, President Pahor dissolved the National Assembly and decided elections will be held on 3 June 2018.

Campaign 
The Italian minority representative in the National Assembly, Roberto Battelli, who has held the post for seven consecutive terms and was the only one to hold this position so far, announced on 16 March 2018 that he would not run again in the following elections. He was one of only two representatives (the other being Janez Janša) to be elected in every election since Slovenia gained its independence in 1992 from Yugoslavia.

During the signing of a treaty with Russian company Gazprom to supply Slovenia with natural gas on April 13, 2018, the Russian Ambassador to Slovenia Doku Zavgayev publicly offered support to DeSUS. This was seen as a diplomatic scandal in Slovenia and an act that violated the Vienna Convention on Diplomatic Relations (VCDR) according to Speaker of National Assembly Milan Brglez (SMC). However, Foreign Minister and DeSUS president Karl Erjavec, a supporter of good relations with Russia, did not see the act as a violation of diplomatic protocol, saying that Ambassador only supported their program and that he hoped other ambassadors would also support it. The Slovenian media speculated that the act could have been pre-arranged between Zavgayev and Erjavec. Former Foreign Minister Dimitrij Rupel also criticized the Russian Ambassador, saying he violated Article 41 and Article 42 of VCDR, which explicitly forbids interference in the internal affairs of a host state. Chairman of the National Assembly Foreign Politics Committee Jožef Horvat (NSi) said that he had never seen anything like it. President Borut Pahor made no statement about the matter. This was the second time a foreign ambassador had interfered in Slovenian internal affairs after American Ambassador Joseph A. Mussomeli had offered his help in forming a government coalition after the 2011 elections, for which he was criticized by then-President Danilo Türk. Ambassador Mussomeli was later called for consultations by the Ministry of Foreign Affairs to explain his statements. Then Ambassador of Slovenia to the United States Roman Kirn (now LMŠ) also met with representatives of State Department.

On 19 April 2018, two Modern Centre Party (SMC) MPs, Branko Zorman and Bojan Krajnc, left the party after National Assembly did not pass Zorman's bill that would liberalize gambling market in Slovenia (which is according to Zorman under control of Social Democrats), saying that party supports corruption (Prime Minister Cerar personally intervened in the SMC Deputy Group and asked MPs to vote against the bill). On that day Simona Kustec Lipicer MP, leader of the SMC in the National Assembly announced that she would not run again in the 2018 elections. However, the party denied Zorman's accusations, saying that Zorman is not pleased with him not being one of the candidates in the 2018 elections and that Krajnc was not satisfied with the electoral district he would have run in.

On 23 April 2018, Milan Balažic (NSD) accused President Borut Pahor of acts which brought Slovenia under the subordination of another country as he had signed the Arbitration Agreement between Croatia and Slovenia when Prime Minister. This is the second charge for President Pahor since 10 April 2018, when the National Assembly charged him in the Final Report of "TEŠ6 Investigative Commission". Solidarnost subsequently started a petition calling for Pahor's resignation. In response, Pahor said that he had already paid for these actions when he lost the 2011 elections.

On 24 April 2018, Slovenian media reported that Matej Tonin (NSi) possess documents that prove that foreign minister Karl Erjavec (DeSUS) has worked for Croatia during Arbitration between the countries. Tonin revealed the documents and informed MPs at the closed session of the National Assembly Tonin also stated that he cannot release them yet because they are still a state secret. DeSUS accused him of lying.

After submitting their candidature lists, some media questioned which MPs supported the lists of candidates of the Party of Alenka Bratušek and the party Good Country. Party of Alenka Bratušek has only 2 MPs (Alenka Bratušek and Mirjam Bon Klanjšček) and Good Country only has 1 MP (Bojan Dobovšek) to submit a list of candidates signatures of 3 MPs are needed. State Election Commission refused to announce the names of the MPs that supported the lists of candidates. Media also stressed that not announcing names of the MPs is against Good Country's efforts for transparency in politics. According to the media, one of the MPs that supported Good Country's list is Franc Laj, former MP for Modern Centre Party (SMC), now forming Deputy Group of Independent MPs in the National Assembly, together with Bratušek, Bon Klanjšček and Dobovšek. Names of other two MPs stay unknown, though some media speculate that Branko Zorman and Bojan Kranjc, also former SMC MPs, who left the party just before the beginning of the campaign, could have supported the candidature lists. MPs of Social Democrats and Modern Centre Party (Dobovšek was elected as SMC MP in 2014, but left the party soon after the elections) are also speculated to offer their signatures. Media later reported that SMC MP Vlasta Počkaj supported candidature lists of Party of Alenka Bratušek and Marija Antonija Kovačič, DeSUS MP, supported candidature list of Dobovšek's Good Country. The official election campaign began on 4 May 2018. The main topics of the campaign were relations with Croatia (arbitration, NLB), the public healthcare system, banks and corruption, hate speech, level of minimum wage and pensions, level of poverty and foreign policy and positioning of Slovenia in the international community, especially relations with the United States.

On 5 May 2018, Slovenian media reported that list of candidates that United Right submitted in the 6th constituency (Novo Mesto) had been rejected because it was not formed according to the law, which stipulates that at least 35% of candidates much be of the opposite sex. United Right submitted a list with 7 male and 2 female candidates, but both female candidates would run in two electoral districts each. The party also contested the decision of the Electoral Commission of the 6th constituency in the Supreme Court, which rejected their appeal on 8 May. The incident is seen as great damage to the party since the head of the party, Aleš Primc, would run in this constituency. The Electoral Commission of the 5th constituency rejected the list of United left and Unity for a similar reason. According to the head of Unity Janko Veber, the Supreme Court rejected their appeal and he added that they would contest its decision in the Constitutional Court. However, according to the law a decision by the Supreme Court is final, said Director of the State Election Commission Dušan Vučko. Unity proposed delaying the election until the verdict of the Constitutional court after the Supreme Court rejected United Right's appeal as well and they proposed the same. On 14 May, the Constitutional Court rejected United Left's appeal. On 7 May, United Right's list of candidates in the 1st constituency was rejected as well for the same reason as the one in the 6th constituency since Metka Zevnik, another key candidate would run in this constituency, the party lost its possibilities to reach the threshold of 4%, Slovenian media reported. This problem opened a broad discussion on gender quotas in politics in Slovenia. The State Election Commission reported on 8 May that the list of Party of Slovenian People in the 2nd constituency had been partially rejected due to a candidate on the list that died in 2017 and was then removed. It also reported that the Social Democrats and the party Andrej Čuš and the Greens of Slovenia (AČZS) had put the same candidate on their lists. The candidate was removed from the list of Andrej Čuš and the Greens of Slovenia because the list of Social Democrats had been submitted first. Due to the removal of the candidate from the list of AČZS, the list in the 3rd constituency was rejected by the State Election Commission (DVK) on 9 May for not reaching the gender quota. Media stressed that two of the four members of the DVK who voted to reject the list were appointed by Social Democrats and SDP (which is the former party of Andrej Čuš). The Supreme Court annulled the decision made by DVK on 12 May.

Hungary's Prime Minister Viktor Orbán, an ally of Janez Janša, came to stump with Janša in mid-May at a rally in Celje, declaring: "If Europe surrenders to mass population movement and immigration, our own Continent will be lost [...] The aim is to settle among us people who do not belong to our culture, and who will want to live here according to their own religions and customs". The Slovenian Democratic Party (SDS) would also run on an anti-immigration platform. One of the SDS's posters depicts migrants and refugees behind a stop sign. In a pre-election debate, a party lawmaker said that "no migrants means a secure Slovenia". Hence, a frequent topic of election debates was hate speech, especially due to Janez Janša and other members of SDS, who are frequently involved in discussions which include hate speech, especially on Twitter. Lucija Ušaj and Žan Mahnič MP, both SDS and candidates in the elections, were exposed because of their activity on Twitter, where they frequently publish statements that can arguably be recognized as hate speech against homosexuals, migrants, Muslims, or political opponents.

Electoral debates 

 Not included: NPS, SSN, SPS, ReSET, ZL and ZD which were not invited to any of the debates or decided not to take part.

Electoral system 
The 90 members of the National Assembly are elected by two methods. 88 are elected by open list proportional representation in eight 11-seat constituencies and seats are allocated to the parties at the constituency level using the Droop quota. The elected Deputies are identified by ranking all of a party's candidates in a constituency by the percentage of votes they received in their district. The seats that remain unallocated are allocated to the parties at the national level using the d'Hondt method with an electoral threshold of 4%. Although the country is divided into 88 electoral districts, deputies are not elected from all 88 districts. More than one deputy is elected in some districts, which results in some districts not having an elected deputy (for instance, 21 of 88 electoral districts did not have an elected deputy in the 2014 elections). Parties must have at least 35% of their lists from each gender, except in cases where there are only three candidates. For these lists, there must be at least one candidate of each gender.

Two additional deputies are elected by the Italian and Hungarian minorities. Voters rank all of the candidates on the ballot paper using numbers (1 being highest priority). A candidate is awarded the most points (equal to the number of candidates on the ballot paper) when a voter ranks them first. The candidate with most points wins.

Parties and leaders 
The table lists all the parties that so far expressed their intention to participate in the elections. SMC, SDS, DeSUS, SD, Levica, NSi, SAB, AČZS, DD and Unity are currently represented in the National Assembly. Not all of the following political parties will be able to take part in the elections due to the criteria set by the law (candidate lists supported with signatures of 3 MPs or 100 signatures in each constituency), especially the smaller ones; and some may form coalitions, such as Third Bloc and United Right.

Parties had to form their lists of candidates for each constituency by 3 May 2018.

Parties that fulfill the criteria

List of all the parties

Opinion polls

Results

Representatives of national minorities

Hungarian national minority

Italian national minority

Elected MPs 

Janez Janša became the only MP to be elected in every election since independence. Several former MPs returned to parliament, including Zmago Jelinčič Plemeniti (SNS) and Brane Golubović (LMŠ, previously PS). All presidents of parliamentary parties were elected except Alenka Bratušek (SAB) and Karl Erjavec (DeSUS).

Reactions

Domestic 
After the election, Janša stated that SDS would do everything in their power to form a stable government. He also expressed the opinion that it was impossible to form a new government without SDS. Articles in the journal Delo noted that although winning the most votes, SDS did not win the election as there is no easy way for them to form a coalition, especially due to the fact that Janša had acted divisively in the past, making potential coalition partners wary. Šarec was viewed as the key player, either as a potential coalition partner with SDS (a scenario that Šarec denounced) or as the next-in-line prime minister-designate in case of Janša failing to form the government.

Although losing a large share of the vote in comparison to the 2014 election, the result of SMC was viewed as a success as the party did not have a strong traditional voting base. In hindsight, Cerar's decision to resign as the PM was seen as a smart tactical move. The results of The Left and Party of Alenka Bratušek were seen as a success for respective parties while SD was seen as losing the votes to the Left. DeSUS got fewer MPs than in 2014, the alliance with Zoran Jankovič not having paid off. NSi increased the number of seats but Tonin nevertheless offered his resignation to the party, not having fulfilled his goal of reaching above 10%. Party leaders Alenka Bratušek of PAB and Karl Erjavec of DeSUS did not get elected into the parliament. The return of SNS after 7 years of absence was viewed as a side-effect of the nationalist rhetoric in the media while Jelinčič publicly stated that he was interested in joining some government as a minister of culture. SLS, once an influential party that participated in several governments, again failed to reach the 4% vote threshold, likely at the expense of SDS. Marko Zidanšek, the party president, immediately resigned.

International 
Some of the European politicians congratulated Janez Janša for his victory, among them are Jean-Claude Juncker, President of the European Commission, Austrian Chancellor Sebastian Kurz and Manfred Weber, leader of the EPP group in the European Parliament.

Several international media, including BBC, CNBC and Al Jazeera, reported on the election result, labelling SDS as "anti-immigration" party and noted that a formation of a stable government will be difficult. The New York Times highlighted Janša's connection to Viktor Orbán, the PM of Hungary, who openly supported SDS, including with Hungarian companies financing the pro-SDS media.

Aftermath

Constitution of the 8th National Assembly 
The opening session of the National Assembly is expected to be held within 20 days of the elections. It was convened by President Borut Pahor, who announced that the session will be on 22 June 2018 at 11:00. The speaker of the National Assembly will be elected at the session. The speaker is usually elected among the MPs of the second largest coalition party, though this is not a rule. Milan Brglez (SMC) was elected speaker in 2014 and France Cukjati (SDS) in 2004.

First session will be presided over by Peter Jožef Česnik (SAB), who is the oldest of the elected MPs.

In the first session only temporary speaker of the National Assembly could be elected, since there is still not outlines of the new coalition. If Speaker will not be elected, Peter Jožef Česnik will become acting speaker until speaker is elected.

Deputy speakers of the National Assembly are expected to be elected later after official formation of the coalition. Two deputy speakers will be elected among the MPs of the coalition parties and one will be elected among the MPs of the biggest opposition party.

Before the constitution of the National Assembly, parties have to name temporary leaders of the political groups. Temporary leader meet with the previous speaker of the National Assembly to organise constitutional session of the new NA, including agenda of the session, members of the Commission for Public Office and Elections, which will convene during the first session to confirm mandates of the elected MPs, and sitting order. SDS surprised with naming Danijel Krivec instead of Jože Tanko, who led the group of SDS for the last 13 years. A reason for that could be disagreements between Tanko and Janez Janša and his disobedience. For example, Tanko was the only member of SDS group that voted in favor of same-sex marriages in the last term and SDS later took part in the campaign against the law in the referendum. In SMC, there were also some internal dissents when party named Igor Zorčič as leader instead of Milan Brglez, who wanted the position himself.

On 18 June temporary leaders of political groups had a meeting with Speaker Milan Brglez to discuss the first session. Jože Tanko (SDS) was chosen to be named President of the Commission for Public Office and Elections.

Election of the Speaker 

Matej Tonin had support of the all parties, except The Left.

Possible candidates for Speaker of the National Assembly

On 12 June, Marjan Šarec said that LMŠ will not propose a candidate for the speaker of the National Assembly. SD claimed the position, since it will be the second biggest coalition party, if Marjan Šarec forms coalition.

If Miro Cerar is elected Speaker it will be the first time that sitting Prime Minister is also President of the National Assembly. According to the Legal Service of the Government of Slovenia, positions are compatible, but only for a short period of time.

Before the first session Marjan Šarec stated, that Matej Tonin (NSi) will be nominated for the Speaker by LMŠ, SD, SMC, NSi, SAB and DeSUS.

Government formation 

Pahor announced before the elections that he would grant a mandate to the winner of the elections. On 3 June, he repeated his statement and Janez Janša is therefore expected to be granted a mandate to form a coalition government, the third time he has had the opportunity to do so after 2004 and 2012. However, all of the centre-left and left-wing parties (LMŠ, SD, SMC, the Left, SAB and DeSUS) have publicly declared that they would not join a government under Janša and the SDS, meaning Janša can only form a minority right-wing government with NSi and SNS and would have to gain the confidence of either LMŠ, SD, SMC or the Left, or court both DeSUS and the centrist list of Alenka Bratušek. A centre-to-centre-left government under the leadership of Marjan Šarec is more likely to be formed, consisting of LMŠ, SD, SMC, SAB, DeSUS and NSi or the Left, though NSi is more likely to be invited to join the coalition. Because of the large number of parties, it is expected that it will be hard to form a government. Some of the political analysts have not ruled out the possibility of new snap elections in November if Šarec fails to form a government.

On 6 June, Marjan Šarec met with Alenka Bratušek, meetings with Miro Cerar (SMC) and Dejan Židan (SD) were on 7 June. Šarec stated that he is willing to accept the mandate to form a government only if there will be a clear will among potential coalition partners to form a government. Dejan Židan (SD) stated that he expects that before leaders of the parliamentary groups meet with President Pahor to consult about granting the mandate, Šarec should already present the outline of the new coalition. Šarec also announced that he will soon invite all the parties, except SDS, for talks to see what are the possibilities to form a government.

On 7 June, Pahor met with Janša to discuss his possibilities to form a new government. Pahor once again repeated that he is going to grant a mandate to Janša, but Janša said that if in the meanwhile another party will form a coalition that will have 46 votes, then he will not accept the mandate to form a government. Janša also did not explicitly rule out the possibility to stand down as potential prime minister-designate and let someone else from his party take the post and form a government, though this scenario is not very likely to happen. Pahor said that he wishes SDS would form a government since governments formed by parties that did not win elections in the past were not very stable, adding governments of Janez Janša (2012) and Alenka Bratušek (2013) as examples. Šarec replied that those two governments cannot be compared with his potential coalition since Janša's government was removed from the office because of the corruption allegations and Bratušek's government was destabilized by her own party, when Janković had to resign as leader of the party due to corruption allegations as well and Bratušek took over the party. Matjaž Han (SD) said in Tarča (political show on RTVSLO) that Social Democrats will not talk with Janša about forming a coalition since talks with Šarec already began.

On 8 June, Marjan Šarec met with Karl Erjavec (DeSUS) to discuss future cooperation. Matej Tonin (NSi) also confirmed talks with Šarec. Meanwhile, SDS is still not commenting on their activities, but Tonin confirmed talks with them as well.

On 12 June, NSi rejected offered resignation of president Matej Tonin, who offered resignation after party did not reach 10% in the election, which was Tonin's goal. The main reason for not accepting his resignation party stated that they improved their result and gained 2 new MPs.

Media reported on 14 June that Modern Centre Party (SMC), Party of Alenka Bratušek (SAB) and List of Marjan Šarec (LMŠ) join into an alliance to form a central liberal bloc.

On 15 June, SDS stated that they will draft a coalition treaty which will later be sent to all parliamentary parties as a basis for negotiations. Later that day, DeSUS rejected Karl Erjavec's resignation as president of the party. Erjavec offered his resignation after a very bad result in the election in which the party lost 5 MPs.

On 26 June Executive Committee of the Modern Centre Party (SMC) ejected Milan Brglez from the party in a unanimous decision. Reason for that was his self-candidature for Speaker of the National Assembly, since Miro Cerar did not have support of potential coalition partners (LMŠ, SD, NSi, SAB and DeSUS) to become Speaker himself. Executive committee also blamed Brglez that he did not respect decision of the parties and has been making statements that were opposite to the statements of Cerar and other party officials. As example they added that Cerar supported US missile strikes against Syria earlier in April and Brglez did not and stated that these acts are against international law and Slovenia's constitution.

On 2 July President Borut Pahor began first round of consultations with leaders of the political groups in the National Assembly. Danijel Krivec (SDS) said that SDS supports their president Janez Janša as candidate for new Prime Minister. Brane Golubović (LMŠ) asked President Pahor if he can make another round of consultation on Friday and that they have no problem with granting mandate to Janez Janša first. Matjaž Han (SD) and Igor Zorčič (SMC) said that they will only support Marjan Šarec as Prime Minister. Zorčič also said that they can join coalition with New Slovenia or The Left. Matej Tašner Vatovec (Levica) said that they do not support any of the candidates.

On 16 July after meeting of the executive council of New Slovenia (NSi) its president Matej Tonin announced that NSi will withdraw for negotiations to form government under Šarec. Decision was expected, even though parties negotiated for almost 12 hours on 14 July to finalize the coalition agreement. Šarec told after negotiations that they were successful and that significant progress was made.

After Matej Tonin (NSi) announced on 24 July that NSi will not further negotiate to form coalition under LMŠ, Marjan Šarec (LMŠ) announced next day that central parties LMŠ, SD, SMC, SAB and DeSUS will begin official coalition negotiations with The Left. Coordinator of The Left Luka Mesec confirmed that the party had received an invitation for negotiations. On 31 June, Levica refused to join the coalition but is ready to support a minority government.

On 2 August Miro Cerar sent a message to members of SMC in which he expressed his doubt about stability of a minority government that could be formed, however he still stressed that they support Šarec as new Prime Minister. It was also reported that The Left presented a project of the government coalition of what they wanted it to look like, which did not have any ministries reserved for the Party of Alenka Bratušek, so the SAB decided they will not join a minority government with their proposed-ministers, but will support the government from the opposition in order to achieve a minority government with the backing from The Left.

On 6 August, Marjan Šarec has said he expects to get the mandate of forming a minority coalition. Later on 7 August, it has been said that on the 8th of August, the LMŠ, SD, SMC, SAB, and DeSUS will “endorse the nomination of Marjan Šarec as PM-designate” and that there will be a vote on 13 August. Mr. Sarec is also hoping that The Left will also endorse his nomination. It has been said that the five parties want the SD leader, Dejan Židan, to be named speaker, if the coalition is formed, although it is not a requirement for the SD to join the coalition, it is a “tradition for the job to go to the second-largest coalition partner,” which would be the Social Democrats.

Forming a coalition will be in the end a question of positions for leaders and other member of the parties. Positions claimed by some of the leaders of the parties as their conditions to join coalition:

A government was finally formed on 13 September by a LMS-SD-SMC-SAB-DeSUS coalition with support from Levica.

References 

Slovenia
2018 in Slovenia
June 2018 events in Europe
Parliamentary elections in Slovenia
8th National Assembly (Slovenia)